Hindsight 20/20 is a greatest hits compilation album by the Canadian comedy music group The Arrogant Worms. The album consists of twenty songs spanning the band’s twenty-year career and a dance remix of "The Last Saskatchewan Pirate."

Track listing
 The Last Saskatchewan Pirate
 Pressure Washer
 Uncle Lou
 I Am Cow
 Jesus' Brother Bob
 Rippy The Gator
 The Mounted Animal Nature Trail
 Rocks And Trees
 Celine Dion
 Big Box Store
 Canada's Really Big
 I Ran Away
 Mime Abduction Song
 The Happy Happy Birthday Song
 Carrot Juice Is Murder
 Go To Sleep Little Leech
 Me Like Hockey
 Big Fat Road Manager
 Santa's Gonna Kick Your Ass
 We Are The Beaver
 Dance Club Remix: The Last Saskatchewan Pirate

2010 greatest hits albums
The Arrogant Worms albums